Let the Music Play is the debut studio album by American dance/freestyle singer Shannon.  The title track (originally called "Fire and Ice"), written by the team of Chris Barbosa and Ed Chisolm, became a big hit, peaking at number 8 on the Billboard Hot 100, and number 1 on the Billboard dance chart.  The album itself would go on to sell over one million copies worldwide. The album garnered Shannon her first Grammy Award nomination for Best Female R&B Vocal Performance, presented at the 27th Grammy Awards in 1985.

Track listing

Original

2006 CD reissue bonus tracks

Chart positions

Production
Executive Producer: Sergio Cossa
Produced by Mark Liggett & Chris Barbosa
Recorded and Engineered by Frank Heller & Jay
Mixed by Chris Barbosa & Chris Lord-Alge
Mastered by Herb Powers Jr.

Personnel
Drum Programming: Chris Barbosa, Rob Kilgore
Percussion: Rob Kilgore
Bass: Tony Bridges
Guitars: Carl Sturken, Charlie Strut, Rob Kilgore
Keyboards: Rob Kilgore, Curtis Josephs
Saxophone: Ed Palermo

References

External links

1984 debut albums
Atco Records albums
Atlantic Records albums
Shannon (singer) albums